The 1901 Black Sea earthquake (also known in Bulgaria as the Balchik earthquake) was a 7.2 magnitude earthquake, the most powerful earthquake ever recorded in the Black Sea. In Romania, the earthquake was felt not only throughout Northern Dobruja, but also in Oltenia and Muntenia, and even in southern Moldova.

The earthquake was followed by a large number of aftershocks, which continued until 1905; the strongest reached magnitudes of 5.5–6.0 on the Richter scale and were also felt in southern Romania, including Bucharest. After 1905, Pontic seismic activity began to subside, although weak and moderate earthquakes were also reported in subsequent years.

Such events are rare in the Black Sea. In the last 200 years, in the Black Sea region 24 tsunamis occurred, of which two were in the territory of Dobruja. The earliest recorded tsunami in Romania dates from 104, when the city of Callatis, current Mangalia, was badly affected.

Background 
The off-shore region of Southern Dobruja, especially the epicentral area located in the south of Mangalia, including the Bulgarian off-shore of the Black Sea, has been emphasized over the years, by earthquakes which in certain cases have been violent, reaching magnitudes of 7–7.5 on Richter scale. These are also crustal earthquakes, of low depth, with severe effects on the epicentral area. Sometimes, in case of earthquakes with underwater focus (as those located in the east of Shabla Cape), tsunami waves were generated, like in 1901.

Research studies carried out by experts have shown that Pontic earthquakes with destructive behaviour, comparable to that in 1901, repeat at mean periods of 300–500 years. One of the earliest occurred in the 1st century BC at Kavarna. The Black Sea is considered one of the most violent seas due to its seismic activity.

Impact

Felt area 
The shock was felt throughout Bulgaria, southeast Romania, eastern Serbia and northwest Anatolia, causing great panic in Istanbul and on the Asiatic coast of the Bosphorus and the Marmara. Long period effects lasting about a minute were reported from the Danube valley, from Szeged in Hungary, and from Odessa. The shock was perceptible in Thessaloniki in Macedonia, in Dorohoi in Romania, and throughout the province of Sivas.

Damage 
Maximum damage was sustained by a small number of villages situated on the alluvial lowlands along the coast between Balchik, Kavarna, Durankulak and Limanu. Slumping of the coast destroyed many landing-places and coastal settlements including the lighthouse at Kaliakra. Largescale landslides along the coast continued to develop for almost two weeks after the earthquake, disrupting communications and causing additional damage. In Bucharest, the seismic intensity was V–VI degrees on the Mercalli intensity scale, causing panic among the population and light damage to buildings.

The Bulgarian province of Dobrich was also severely hit by tsunami. In several localities, including Balchik, homes were rushed by waters.

See also
 List of earthquakes in 1901
 List of earthquakes in Bulgaria
 List of earthquakes in Romania

References 

Earthquakes in Romania
1901 earthquakes
Earthquakes in Bulgaria
1901 in Romania
History of the Black Sea
1901 tsunamis
March 1901 events
1901 disasters in Europe